this is the first game in the Leiji Matsumoto's PS1 trilogy of Space Battleship Yamato games.

Reception
On release, Famitsu magazine scored the game a 33 out of 40.

References

External links

Space Battleship Yamato at UK GameSpot
 Bandai's site for its series of Space Battleship Yamato games for the PlayStation 2  

1999 video games
Japan-exclusive video games
PlayStation (console) games
PlayStation (console)-only games
Bandai games
Space Battleship Yamato video games
Video games developed in Japan